{{safesubst:#invoke:RfD|||month = March
|day = 13
|year = 2023
|time = 21:17
|timestamp = 20230313211727

|content=
redirectAlexander the Great

}}